Lievestuore is the second biggest district in Laukaa, Finland. Its population in 2018 was about 2500.

Services
Lievestuore has a school, a day care center, a youth center, a health center and a pharmacy, a church, a pub, a restaurant and a grocery store.

History
The meaning of the name Lievestuore is unclear. It may have a Sámi origin, over time morphed into the current form by Finnic settlers. The toponym itself was first mentioned in 1552 as Leffuitorij, referring to hunting grounds owned by the men of Tuulos.

Lievestuoreen sellutehdas, a cellulose factory existed between 1927–1985.

Famous natives
Sylvi Saimo, sprint canoeist

Gallery

See also
Lievestuoreenjärvi
Nokkakivi

References

External links
http://www.lievestuore.fi/

Geography of Central Finland
Laukaa